The red-and-black thrush (Geokichla mendeni), also known as the Peleng thrush, is a species of bird in the family Turdidae. It is endemic to forests on the  Indonesian islands of Taliabu and Peleng, where threatened by habitat loss. Traditionally, it has been considered a subspecies of the red-backed thrush.

References

Birds described in 1939
Endemic birds of Sulawesi
Geokichla
Taxa named by Oscar Neumann
Taxonomy articles created by Polbot